Carlos Ríchard Díaz (born 4 February 1979, in Montevideo) is a Uruguayan former footballer. He last played for Boston River in the Segunda División Uruguay.

He was a two-times FIFA U-20 World Cup player.

External links

Profile at Tenfield
Defensor Sporting profile

1979 births
Living people
Uruguayan footballers
Uruguay under-20 international footballers
Uruguay international footballers
Uruguayan expatriate footballers
Uruguayan Primera División players
Uruguayan Segunda División players
Categoría Primera A players
Defensor Sporting players
Peñarol players
Rampla Juniors players
Racing Club de Montevideo players
Atlético Bucaramanga footballers
Expatriate footballers in Colombia
1997 FIFA Confederations Cup players
1997 Copa América players
2001 Copa América players
Association football fullbacks
Footballers from Montevideo
Association football defenders